Mohammad Noje (March 25, 1945 – August 16, 1979) was a pilot in the Islamic Republic of Iran Air Force based at Hamedan Air Base. He and his copilot were both killed in action in an operation against Kurdish insurgents near Paveh in Kermanshah province in the west of Iran. After this operation, the IRIAF changed the name of Hamedan Air Base to Noje Airbase.

Life and education 
Mohammad was born in 1945 in Tehran. After completing high school, he entered the Air-force University to study weapon control. Later he changed his major to become a pilot in the Iranian Air Force. He started his training in Iran and completed his flight training in the United States in 1972.

He started his career in the Iranian Air Force as an F-4 pilot. He and his copilot Bashir Mousavi were performing a reconnaissance flight and close support of ground forces of the Iranian Army in a battle against Kurdish insurgents when their aircraft was struck by enemy fire. Neither Mohammad Nojeh nor Bashir Mousavi had a chance to eject.

Noje is considered the first pilot to be killed in action after the Iranian revolution in 1979.

References

People from Tehran
Kabudarahang County
Iranian aviators
Islamic Republic of Iran Air Force personnel
1979 deaths
1945 births